The Bohannon B-1 is a purpose-built aircraft to set new world records in its class for time-to-climb. It is a development of the Van's RV-4.

Development
Bohannon and Miller built the Miller-Bohannon JM-2 Pushy Galore to set new time to climb records and compete in Formula One air racing. Bohannon set out to continue time to climb records with a new aircraft. He acquired Exxon as a sponsor for record attempts. His B-1 was painted in a stylized tiger paint scheme and named the "Exxon Flyin' Tiger". The aircraft went on to set 30 altitude and time to climb records.

Design
The Bohannon B-1 is an all-metal single place, low-wing aircraft with conventional landing gear. For 2001 attempts, a Lycoming IO-555 was installed.

Operational history
The B-1 has set, and beat, its own records several times. The B-1 operates in the FAI C-1b Class. (Piston aircraft ). 
1999 - Time to climb to  record of 2 minutes and 20 seconds.
2000 - Time to climb to  - Six minutes, thirty seven seconds.
2001 - Absolute ceiling for a piston engine aircraft - .
2002 - Absolute ceiling -  
2002 - Absolute ceiling - .
2003 - Absolute ceiling - 47,067 ft (14 346 m)

Specifications (Bohannon B-1)

See also

References

Homebuilt aircraft